Anna Bartlett Warner (August 31, 1827 – January 22, 1915) was an American writer, the author of several books, and of poems set to music as hymns and religious songs for children.

Biography
Anna Bartlett Warner was born on Long Island on August 31, 1827.

She died at her home in Highland Falls, New York on January 22, 1915.

Work
The best known of her hymns is almost certainly "Jesus Loves Me". Some stanzas of this appear in modern hymnals rewritten by David Rutherford McGuire.

She wrote some books jointly with her sister Susan Warner (Elizabeth Wetherell) which included Wych Hazel (1853), Mr. Rutherford's Children (1855) and The Hills of the Shatemuc (1856). She sometimes wrote under the pseudonym Amy Lothrop. She wrote thirty-one novels on her own, the most popular of which was Dollars and Cents (1852), Others were Gold of Chickaree, In West Point Colors (1904), Stories of Blackberry Hollow and Stories of Vinegar Hill (1872). She also wrote a biography of her sister Susan.

Legacy
Her former family home is now a museum on the grounds of The United States Military Academy   which was opposite the house during her lifetime and where her uncle had been chaplain from 1828–1838. The Constitution Island Association have worked hard to maintain the house and restore the gardens so that they are similar to their appearance in Anna Warner's lifetime, following her month-by-month descriptions of life on Constitution Island, as written in Gardening by Myself.

References

External links

 
 
 

1827 births
1915 deaths
People from Long Island
American Christian hymnwriters
American evangelicals
American Presbyterians
Burials at West Point Cemetery
19th-century American writers
19th-century American women writers
American women hymnwriters
American women non-fiction writers
Writers from New York (state)